is a lighthouse in the city of Wakkanai, Hokkaidō, Japan. The old Wakkanai Lighthouse was built in 1900 in the hills above, but was forced to relocate after the area was taken over for a US base, the site now occupied by a JGSDF radar station. This first lighthouse provided one of the locations for the filming of Shochiku's 1957 Times of Joy and Sorrow. Wakkanai Lighthouse was rebuilt to the same height in its current location in 1966. With its vibrant red and white stripes, the lighthouse is today a symbol of Cape Noshappu and is made accessible to the general public by Wakkanai Coast Guard from the start of Golden Week each year.

See also 
 List of lighthouses in Japan
 Cape Sōya Lighthouse

References

Further reading
Brunton, Richard. Building Japan, 1868–1879. Japan Library, 1991. 
Pedlar, Neil. The Imported Pioneers: Westerners who Helped Build Modern Japan. Routledge, 1990.

External links 

 Wakkanai Lighthouse 

Wakkanai, Hokkaido
Lighthouses in Japan
Buildings and structures in Hokkaido
Lighthouses completed in 1900
1900 establishments in Japan